Underwater Adventure is a 1954 children's book by the Canadian-born American author Willard Price featuring his "Adventure" series characters, Hal and Roger Hunt. It was published by John Day in the US and Jonathan Cape in the UK. The book is about how they go diving and snorkelling for the Oceanographic institute, with a braggish and self-centered man, Skink, on their exciting journey.

1954 American novels
Novels by Willard Price
Underwater adventure novels
1954 children's books
John Day Company books